For His Mother's Sake is a 1922 American silent film, starring heavyweight boxing champion Jack Johnson. It was a Blackburn-Velde Pictures production distributed by Fidelity Pictures Company. The film opened in January 1922 at the New Douglas Theater at Lexington Avenue and 142nd Street in Harlem. It is believed there was only one five reel print of the movie, due to the studio owners seizing the negative when the film's producers failed to pay their bills.

Plot 
Johnson's character in the film flees to Mexico after taking the blame for a crime committed by his brother. It has been described as a "prodigal son" story. Johnson has been described as demonstrating, in this film, in As the World Rolls On, and through his prizefighting, "to a generation of African-American male youth that athletics was one of the few ways out of the ghetto or off the sharecropper's farm."

Mattie Willes portrayed Johnson's mother in the sentimental melodrama about a man taking the blame for his brother's crime.

Banned
The Ohio State Bureau of Motion Pictures banned the film because of Johnson's criminal record.

Cast
Jack Johnson
Adrian Joyce
Matty Wilkins / Mattie Wilkins
Jack Hopkins
Jack Newton
Dick Lee
Hank West
Everett Godfrey
Edward McMowan
Ruth Walker
Mattie Wilkes

References

American boxing films